Falyn Talei Fonoimoana (born March 3, 1992) is an American professional indoor and beach volleyball player who plays as an opposite hitting for indoor professional league Athletes Unlimited. She has also represented the U.S. National Team in the 2015 Pan-American Games, earning a gold medal with the team.

Personal life

Falyn Talei Fonoimoana was born and raised in Hermosa Beach, California. She comes from a diverse ancestral background: she is African American, English, Irish, Austrian, German, Hawaiian, Tahitian, and Samoan. She comes from an athletic family, as her uncle, Eric Fonoimoana, was a gold medalist in beach volleyball in the 2000 Summer Olympics. She attributed her interest in volleyball from a young age to Eric, as she used to be a ball girl for him. Her mother, Debbie, also played beach volleyball and trained with her sister, Lelei Fonoimoana, who swam in the 1976 Summer Olympics in Montreal, Quebec at 17 years old.

In high school, she attended Mira Costa High School in Manhattan Beach, California. The top-ranked national recruit in her graduating class, she was regarded as one of the best players ever at the high school level.

Fonoimoana has a son who was born in August 2012.

Career

College
During Fonoimoana's freshman season in 2010, she was 2nd on her team in kills and was named the Pac-10 Freshman of the Year, as well as AVCA Pacific Region Freshman of the Year. However, her collegiate career was cut short during the beginning of her sophomore season in 2011: Southern California abruptly announced she was ineligible for the season. It was not clear why she was ineligible, but she never returned to play collegiately again.

Professional clubs (indoor)

2012–2013  Orientales de Humacao
2013–2014  Criollas de Caguas
2014–2015  PGE Atom Trefl Sopot
2015–2016  Changos de Naranjito
2015–2016  Indias de Mayagüez
2015–2016  Criollas de Caguas
2022  Athletes Unlimited

After retiring from indoor competition in 2016, she decided to return to it in 2022 and signed with American professional league Athletes Unlimited. During her season, she was voted MVP 1 of the match by her teammates and opponents when she posted a team-high 15 kills with seven digs. Not far into the season, she had five games with 10 or more kills. By the conclusion of the season, she ranked #19 out of 44 players with 2,209 total ranking points, averaging 2.86 kills per set, 103 digs, and 9 solo blocks.

USA National Team (indoor)

Fonoimoana was selected to represent the United States at the 2015 Pan American Games. United States won the gold medal after defeating Brazil in the final.

Awards and honors

Indoor clubs

Team
 2013–2014 Puerto Rican League –  Gold medal, with Criollas de Caguas.
 2014–2015 CEV Cup –  Silver medal, with PGE Atom Trefl Sopot
 2014–2015 TURON Liga –  Silver medal, with PGE Atom Trefl Sopot
 2014–2015 Polish Cup –  Gold medal, with PGE Atom Trefl Sopot
 2015–2016 Puerto Rican League –  Gold medal, with Criollas de Caguas.

Individual
Puerto Rican League - Best Server (2012–2013), with Orientales de Humacao.
Puerto Rican League - Best Receiver (2013–2014), with Criollas de Caguas.

College

AVCA Pacific Region Freshman of the Year (2010)
Pac-10 Freshman of the Year (2010)

Beach volleyball
Fonoimoana committed to the AVP Tour in 2018 and has competed in several professional tournaments. She finished 4th in the 2019 AVP Austin with partner Nicolette Martin. In August 2021, Fonoimoana and her partner Geena Urango finished in 13th place at the Women's AVP $100,000 Gold Series Atlanta Open.

USA National Team (beach)
Fonoimoana has also represented the US in beach competition. She has won three gold medals, two silver medals, and one bronze medal in the NORCECA Beach Tours.

External links
Athletes Unlimited Profile

References

1992 births
Living people
Volleyball players from California
People from Hermosa Beach, California
Outside hitters
Opposite hitters
American women's volleyball players
American women's beach volleyball players
American volleyball coaches
USC Trojans women's volleyball players
Volleyball players at the 2015 Pan American Games
Pan American Games gold medalists for the United States
Pan American Games medalists in volleyball
Medalists at the 2015 Pan American Games
American expatriate sportspeople in Poland
Expatriate volleyball players in Poland
21st-century African-American sportspeople
21st-century African-American women
20th-century African-American people
20th-century African-American women
African-American volleyball players
Mira Costa High School alumni